The 2016–17 Holy Cross Crusaders men's basketball team represented the College of the Holy Cross during the 2016–17 NCAA Division I men's basketball season. The Crusaders, led by second-year head coach Bill Carmody, played their home games at the Hart Center in Worcester, Massachusetts as members of the Patriot League. They finished the season 15–17, 9–9 in Patriot League play to finish in fifth place. As the No. 5 seed in the Patriot League tournament, they lost in the quarterfinals to Navy.

Previous season
The Crusaders finished the 2015–16 season 15–20, 5–13 in Patriot League play to finish in ninth place. As the No. 9 seed in the Patriot League tournament, they defeated Loyola (MD), Bucknell, Army, and Lehigh to win the Patriot League Tournament championship and earn the conference's automatic bid to the NCAA tournament. As a No. 16 seed in the Tournament, they defeated Southern in the First Four to advance to the First Round where they lost to Oregon.

Offseason

Departures

2016 recruiting class

Roster

Schedule and results

|-
!colspan=9 style=|Exhibition

|-
!colspan=9 style=|Non-conference regular season

|-
!colspan=9 style=|Patriot League regular season

|-
!colspan=9 style=| Patriot League tournament

References

Holy Cross Crusaders men's basketball seasons
Holy Cross
Holy Cross Crusaders men's basketball
Holy Cross Crusaders men's basketball